Tales may refer to:

Arts and entertainment
Tales (album), a 1995 album by Marcus Miller
Tales (film), a 2014 Iranian film
Tales (TV series), an American television series
Tales (video game), a 2016 point-and-click adventure game
Tales (video game series), a series of role-playing games
"Tales", or "Tales from the Forest of Gnomes", a song by Wolfmother from Wolfmother
"Tales", a song by Schoolboy Q from Crash Talk

Geography
Tales, Castellón, a municipality in Spain
Täles Railway (disambiguation), two railway lines in Baden-Württemberg in Germany

People
Rémi Tales (born 1984), French rugby union player
Tales Schütz, Brazilian footballer

See also
Tale (disambiguation)